The British School of Amsterdam is an international school, situated in Amsterdam, Netherlands, teaching children from nursery through to Year 13. The school follows the National Curriculum for England and is the first school in the Netherlands to be accredited by the UK Government as a British School Overseas. The School was re-accredited following an inspection in November 2017. The school is a member of the Council of British International Schools.

History

Early years 

The British School of Amsterdam was founded in 1978 by three families who were on two-year contracts in Amsterdam and did not want their children to fall behind the British system when they returned to the UK. Initially the "school" as it was then was situated in one of the family's living room.

By the summer of 1980, the families secured the use of a building in Jekerstraat 86 in the then-borough of Amsterdam Nieuw-Zuid which it shared with another school. At the time, the British School only taught kindergarten and primary school pupils. Initially, there was not a headmaster (with a brief exception in the second half of 1981), but there was a head-teacher by the name of Linda Duffy.

In the summer of 1982, the school moved to the top floor of the Nicolaas Maas School in Heinzestraat 9 in Amsterdam Oud-Zuid. The two schools shared a playground and a gymnasium. The children in the school were aged between 3 and 11 years old.

Mr. Roberts takes over 

In 1983, all of the full-time teaching-staff resigned, but for separate reasons (however, continuity was ensured by the auxiliary teaching-staff, supply teachers and other staff, board of governors, PTA, etc.). While recruiting new teachers, the school decided to employ a headmaster. Michael W. G. Roberts, who had been deputy head of a school in Newcastle, England moved to Amsterdam and joined the school in 1983 as Headmaster and class teacher of the oldest children, a mixed group from 8 to 11 years of age.

In January 1985 the Amsterdam Gemeente Amsterdam (city council) allowed the school to take over the Jan van Eijckstraat 21 site (in Amsterdam Nieuw-Zuid) which had been used as a temporary residence for schools undergoing major renovation etc. The school occupied this site until April 2021. This was also the first time the school had an entire building all to itself. At this time there were five members of full-time teaching-staff and 40 pupils in the school. Until this time the three to five-year-old children had all been in one class but when the school moved this group was divided and the first Nursery class was created.

As the number of children increased the decision was made to create classrooms and a staff common room in the roof of the Jan van Eijckstraat building which meant the school could take in more children gradually creating year group classes rather than ones that were partially vertically grouped.

Expansion 

In 1999 the numbers grew so rapidly that the school needed to rent another building for a year while the Board of Governors and Headmaster looked for a long-term solution to the growing need for suitable space as pupil numbers grew. The oldest children in the school were relocated in the West of Amsterdam, to a school in Orteliusstraat. School buses were arranged to take the children every morning and afternoon from Jan van Eijckstraat to and from the other site and the Gemeente gave the School its very own British School of Amsterdam bus stop.

In 2002 the School bought the site at Anthonie van Dijckstraat and leased the building across the road, next to the Montessori School, which was named the Jubilee Building. The school offices and one of the three nursery classes were in the Jubilee Building and the two other nursery classes, Reception, Year 1 and Year 2 were in Anthonie van Dijckstraat. The rest of the school was still located at Jan van Eijckstraat.

During these years the pupil numbers were always greatest in the Nursery and Reception and gradually decreased as the children grew older as many families made the decision to return to their home countries for their children to continue a more familiar system of education. However, as pupil numbers and demand increased the School gradually added year groups, building up to the point where there were enough older children to create a Senior School and offer British examinations. In 2004 the Senior School moved to the site at Frederick Roeskestraat.

In 2010, The British School of Amsterdam was changed into a stichting (a foundation). The main office is located at Havenstraat 6. The current school roll is just over 1,000.

In April of 2021, The British School of Amsterdam Switched buildings from the site at Frederick Roeskestraat to the building at Havenstraat 6, a renovated prison from World War 2.

School principals

 1981 - 1981 David F. Jones
 1983 - 2010 Michael W. G. Roberts OBE (former deputy headmaster in Newcastle, England)
 2010 - 2013 John Light (former Rector at Edinburgh Academy, Scotland)
 2013 - 2016 Jonnie Goyer (former Head at Farlington School, England)
 2016 - 2022 Paul Morgan (former Deputy Headmaster at St Paul's School, Brazil)
 2022 - 2023 Ruth Sanderson (former Senior Vice Principal - Head of Secondary at Doha College)

Headteacher
 1978(?)- 1983 Linda Duffy (née Whitten)

Campus

The Early Years School
The Early Years School accommodates children in Nursery, Reception and Year 1. The school has accommodation for four classes in each year group. It used to be located on Anthonie van Dijckstraat now it is the situation on the ground floor at Havenstraat 6. All classrooms have direct access to a playground. The school houses teaching classrooms, two Dutch classrooms, two EALT rooms, Learning Support Rooms, an Occupational Therapy Room, a Busy Room, Music Room, a large school hall, a gymnasium and a library.

Junior School
The Junior and Senior schools used to be on Fred Roeskestraat, 1.5 kilometers from the current site. The Junior School accommodates Years 2 to 6 with four classes per year group. Maximum class size of 24. It consists of teaching classrooms, a music room, and access to a sports hall. Each year group has a shared space to do project work.

Senior School
The Senior School is from Years 7 to 13. Maximum class size is 22 pupils. In Years 10 and 11, pupils sit GCSEs and IGCSEs. In the Sixth Form (Years 12 and 13), the students take courses leading to A Levels and International A Levels.

New building

Since being founded in 1978, The British School grew to occupy three separate locations in Amsterdam Old South. In February 2017, The British School of Amsterdam acquired Havenstraat 6 in Amsterdam Oud-Zuid (Old South), a 19th-century listed building that was then redeveloped. Havenstraat 6 was designed and built between 1888 and 1891. AtelierPRO was chosen as the lead architect for the new school. Hoogevest Architecten, which was involved in the renovation of the Rijksmuseum, was responsible for the renovation work. Other technical advisers involved have worked on transforming locations in Amsterdam such as the Anne Frank House, Hermitage Amsterdam and the Van Gogh museum. The new building was formally handed over to the school in February 2021. At the end of the Spring Term the school relocated to the new site and it was opened to the pupils on 21 April 2021 for the Summer Term.

External links

 

Educational institutions established in 1980
Amsterdam
International schools in Amsterdam
1980 establishments in the Netherlands